Sunny Gupta (born 27 September 1988) is an Indian cricketer from Jamshedpur, Bihar. He is a right-handed batsman and a right-arm offbreak bowler. He plays for Tamil Nadu in Ranji Trophy and played for Delhi Capitals in the Indian Premier League.

Life
Gupta studied at Inderprastha University in Chennai and continued his further education at Loyola College, Chennai.

References

Indian cricketers
1988 births
Living people
People from Jamshedpur
Tamil Nadu cricketers
Delhi Capitals cricketers
Loyola College, Chennai alumni
Jharkhand cricketers
Bihar cricketers
Cricketers from Jharkhand